Peter Selvakumar was a Tamil director, producer and story writer.

Filmography

Film writer 
 Sandhippu
 Sivappu Sooriyan
 Moondru Mugam
 Dharma Yuddham
 Erimalai
 Grammathu minnal
 Kaali koil kabali
 Priya
 Bhairavi
 Kairasikkaran
 Pudhiya Vazhkai

Film producer 
 Amman Koil Kizhakale
 Ninaive Oru Sangeetham
 Ponmana Selvan
 Dhayam Onnu (also director)

Television writer 
 Mangai
 Sondham
 Vazhkai
 Vazhnthu Kaatugiren
 Sorgam

Awards and recognition 
Selvakumar was posthumously awarded a Life Time Achievement award from AVM productions.

References

External links
 http://www.rajinifans.com/celebrity/peter-selvakumar.php
 https://www.imdb.com/title/tt0318983/

Tamil screenwriters
Tamil film directors
Tamil film producers
Film directors from Chennai
Film producers from Chennai
Screenwriters from Tamil Nadu